This is a partial list of films set in Rio de Janeiro.

B
Blame It on Rio (1984)

C
Central Station (1998)
Charlie Chan in Rio (1941)
City of God (2002)
City of Men (2007)

D
Double Trouble (1984)
Dhoom 2 (2006)

E
Elite Squad (2007)
Elite Squad: The Enemy Within (2010)
Emmanuelle in Rio (2003)

F
Fast Five (2011)
Favela Rising (2005)
Flying Down to Rio (1933)
Four Days in September (1997)
From Beginning to End (2009)
Fletch

G
Girl from Rio (2001)
The Girl from Rio (1969)
Godzilla: King of the Monsters (2019) (briefly)

H
L'homme de Rio (1964)

I
The Incredible Hulk (2008)

K
Kickboxer 3: The Art of War (1992)

M
Moonraker (1979)

O
Orfeu Negro (1959)
OSS 117: Lost in Rio (2009) 
OSS 117 Mission for a Killer (1965)

P
Penguins of Madagascar (2014) (briefly)

R
Reaching for the Moon (2013)
Rio (1939)
Rio (2011)
Rio 2 (2014) (beginning) 
Rio, I Love You (2014) 
Rio 2096: A Story of Love and Fury (2013)
Rio Sex Comedy (2010)
Road to Rio (1947)

S
Saludos Amigos (1943)

T
The Twilight Saga: Breaking Dawn – Part 1 (2011)
 The Pebble and the Penguin (1995)
 The Producers (2005) (briefly)

W
Wild Orchid (1989)

Rio
 
Brazil culture-related lists